The Kouhrang 1 Dam is a masonry gravity dam on the Kouhrang River about  southwest of Chelgard in Chaharmahal and Bakhtiari Province, Iran. Since the era of Shah Abbas I, attempts had been made to diver the Kouhrang to the Zayandeh. Eventually, efforts by Alexander Gibb between 1948 and 1954 led to the completion of the Kouhrang 1 Dam and Tunnel.

Gallery

See also
Kouhrang 2 Dam – downstream, feeds water into the Kouhrang 2 tunnel
Kouhrang 3 Dam – under construction downstream, feeds water into the Kouhrang 3 tunnel

References

Dams in Chaharmahal and Bakhtiari Province
Interbasin transfer
Dams completed in 1954
Gravity dams
Kuhrang County
Masonry dams
Tourist attractions in Chaharmahal and Bakhtiari Province
1954 establishments in Iran